Araespor longicollis is a species of beetle in the family Cerambycidae.

References

Cerambycinae
Beetles described in 1878